The North Carolina Women's Hall of Fame is an initiative that emerged from the Governor's Conference for Women in 2009 to recognize women who have provided leadership in community service, their professions, or advocacy for women’s rights in North Carolina.

History
The initiative was founded in 2009 during the annual Governor's Conference for Women. The conference, formed in 2006, to provide networking opportunities and discuss women's issues, created the initiative to annually recognize women who were North Carolina leaders as a part of the conference. The criteria for induction requires that the nominees had achieved recognition within North Carolina for community service, within their professions, or for their advocacy on women's rights and issues of concern to women.

Inductees

References 

Halls of fame in North Carolina
Lists of American women
Women's halls of fame
Organizations established in 2009
2009 establishments in North Carolina
State halls of fame in the United States
Women in North Carolina